Manchester Metropolitan University is located in the centre of Manchester, England. The university has over 40,000 students and over 4,000 members of staff. It is home to four faculties (Arts and Humanities, Business and Law, Health and Education and Science and Engineering) and is one of the largest universities in the UK for biggest student population in 2020/21.

History 

Manchester Metropolitan University was developed from mergers of various colleges with various specialisms, including technology, art and design. Its founding can be traced back to the Manchester Mechanics Institute, and the Manchester School of Design latterly known as the Manchester School of Art. The painter L. S. Lowry attended in the years after the First World War, where he was taught by the noted impressionist Adolphe Valette. Schools of Commerce (founded 1889), Education (f. 1878), and Domestic Science (f. 1880) were added alongside colleges at Didsbury, Crewe, Alsager and the former Domestic and Trades College (f. 1911). The Manchester College of Science and Technology, which had originally been the Mechanics Institute and would then become UMIST, transferred its non-degree courses to the School of Art by 1966. The school renamed itself as Manchester Polytechnic in 1970, which was followed by series of mergers with the Didsbury College of Education and Hollings College in 1977, as well as City of Manchester College of Higher Education in 1983. In 1987, the institution became a founding member of the Northern Consortium, and became a corporate body on 1 April 1989 as allowed by the terms of the Education Reform Act.

On 15 September 1992, Manchester Polytechnic gained university status under the wide-sweeping Further and Higher Education Act 1992, and has since rebranded as Manchester Metropolitan University.

After earning university status, Manchester Met absorbed Crewe and Alsager College of Higher Education, and in 2004 the Manchester School of Physiotherapy (MSOP), an institution officially formed in 1991 through the amalgamation of the Schools of Physiotherapy of the Manchester Royal Infirmary (MRI) and of Withington Hospital. MSOP was previously affiliated with the Victoria University of Manchester, which conferred degree-level courses by extension until the final class of 2005. MSOP joined Manchester Metropolitan University as the Department of Physiotherapy in 2004, and was later renamed as the Department of Health Professions.

The University's logo is derived from the upper part of the shield of the university's coat-of-arms, with six spade-irons positioned together, suggesting hard toil and entrenchment.

Campus

The university was previously located on seven sites: five in Manchester (All Saints, Aytoun, Didsbury, Elizabeth Gaskell, and Hollings) and two in Cheshire (Alsager and Crewe). However, the university later closed six of the seven sites to rationalise its estate. The university moved the work of the Alsager campus to Crewe, while the Aytoun campus was closed in 2012 following the opening of a Business School on the main campus. The Elizabeth Gaskell, Hollings and Didsbury campuses were closed in 2014, with faculties being relocated to the main city centre campus in Manchester. The Crewe campus closed in summer 2019, a decision taken following a review conducted by financial advisory firm Deloitte.

Manchester Metropolitan University now comprises four faculties, led by Faculty Pro-Vice-Chancellors, 14 University Centres for Research and Knowledge Exchange, 10 Professional Services Directorates and a range of schools and departments.

The four faculties are:

Business and Law

The Faculty of Business and Law has more than 10,000 undergraduate and postgraduate students enrolled on 120 different degree programmes. The faculty consists of the Business School, which holds the globally recognised trio of accreditations from EQUIS, AACSB and AMBA, and the Manchester Law School. The faculty is also home to the majority of the university’s Degree Apprenticeship programmes, with more than 2,400 apprentices studying across 15 programmes with 530 employer partners.

Arts and Humanities

With more than 9,000 undergraduate, postgraduate taught and postgraduate research students, the Faculty of Arts and Humanities supports a large creative community. The faculty offers a range of subjects, from journalism to fashion to architecture, across 11 departments and schools.

Science and Engineering

More than 6,000 students in the Faculty of Science and Engineering benefit from nearly 100 undergraduate and postgraduate degree programmes in a variety of subjects. A new, £115m base for the faculty is currently in development, which will include teaching and research spaces, a 200-student super lab, study areas and green spaces.

Health and Education

Home to around 9,000 students across 6 departments, the Faculty of Health and Education provides an inclusive learning and training environment based in the Brooks building.

Library

The Library offers a study skills service and houses a number of special collections mainly relating to the fine and applied arts, like the Laura Seddon Greeting Card Collection, a collection of Victorian and Edwardian greeting cards. The North West Film Archive is managed by Manchester Metropolitan University’s Library and is located within the Central Library. In 2021, the Manchester Poetry Library opened in the Grosvenor building.

Campus investment

The University’s 10 year Estate Masterplan 2017 – 2027 was complemented by a £379m commitment to the Estates Investment Programme until 2024, delivering a range of projects including: the Arts and Humanities development, the Science and Engineering development, the School of Digital Arts (SODA), Manchester Metropolitan Institute of Sport, and the Student Residential portfolio.

Organisation

Governance
In common with most universities in the United Kingdom, Manchester Met is headed formally by the Chancellor, currently Lord Mandelson but led by the Vice-Chancellor, currently Professor Malcolm Press CBE.

The University's Board of Governors is responsible for determining the educational character and mission of the University. It also falls to the Board of Governors to ensure that the University's resources are used in line with the University's Article of Government. It also safeguards the University's assets and approves the annual estimates of income and expenditure.

The Board of Governors is responsible for broad policy but the Vice-Chancellor, along with the University Executive Group, is responsible for overall management, policy implementation, organisation, operations and direction of the University.

In December 2014, it was announced that Malcolm Press had been appointed to succeed John Brooks as Vice Chancellor on 1 June 2015.

Manchester Met has around 40,000 students[1], making it currently the 11th in the UK for the biggest student population in 2020/21. The University employs over 4,000 staff.

Finances
In the financial year ending 31 July 2021, Manchester Metropolitan University had a total income of £369m.

Rankings 
Manchester Metropolitan University is the ninth most popular university by applications in the UK (UCAS 2021/22 entry).

According to The Complete University Guide, Manchester Metropolitan University is ranked #54 out of 130 within the UK, based on overall rating, entry standards, research quality, and graduate prospects. The Times Higher Education World University Rankings places Manchester Met at #65, and continued to rank the university in the #601–800 tier internationally.

Manchester Metropolitan University was the highest LGBT+ recruiting university by the number of accepted applicants in 2020 at 720.

Research
30% of Manchester Met’s overall research has been rated at the highest world leading (4*) level and 90% of its research impact is rated ‘world leading’ (4*) or ‘internationally excellent’, (3*) across more than 740 academics.  

The university has fourteen research centres:

 Advanced Materials and Surface Engineering
 Business Transformations
 Bioscience Research Centre
 Centre for Applied Computational Science
 Centre for Creative Writing, English Literature and Linguistics
 Centre for Decent Work and Productivity
 Ecology and Environment
 Education and Social Research Institute
 Future Economies
 Health, Psychology and Communities
 History Research Centre
 Manchester School of Art Research Centre
 Musculoskeletal Science and Sports Medicine
 Research Centre for Applied Social Sciences

Students' Union

The Students' Union exists to represent all members at the Manchester Metropolitan University and students on accredited external courses. The Union is led by the Union Officers Group formed of five students of the university, elected by the students to lead the Union on their behalf. A shop and café catering to university students has also been set up inside the Students' Union. The Students' Union moved in January 2015 to a new purpose-built building on Higher Cambridge Street, next to Cambridge and Cavendish Halls of Residence.

Notable alumni 
Some in the list attended institutions which became part of present-day Manchester Metropolitan University.

Arts and Creative
 John Bishop, comedian, presenter 
 John Bradley, actor
 Sarah Burton OBE, Creative Director, Alexander McQueen
 James Corner, landscape architect
 Brian Cosgrove OBE, animator, producer, director
 Malcolm Garrett MBE, Graphic Designer 
 Ian Griffiths, Creative Director, Max Mara
 Thomas Heatherwick CBE, designer
 Bernard Hill, actor
 Liz Jolly, Chief Librarian, British Library
 Gethin Jones, presenter
 Liz Kessler, writer
 L.S. Lowry, artist
 Martin Parr CBE, photographer
 Michelle Yeoh, actor
 Peter Saville CBE, graphic designer
 John Thomson, actor and comedian
 David Threlfall, actor
 Dame Julie Walters DBE, actress
 Carey Young, artist
Business
 Helen Connolly, CEO, New Look
 Anne-Marie Corner, businesswoman
 Carl Ennis, Chief Executive, Siemens plc
 Paul Hudson, CEO, Sanofi
 Bridget Lea, Managing Director Commercial Division, BT and EE
 Jonathan Mildenhall, CEO, TwentyFirstCenturyBrand
 Nick Read, CEO Vodafone Group
 Dame Dianne Thompson DBE, businesswoman
 Michael Turner CBE, Chairman, Babcock International
 Paul Walsh, Executive Chairman, McLaren Group
Public sector and law
 Keith Bradley (Baron Bradley PC)
 Theresa Grant OBE, Interim Chief Executive, Liverpool City Council
 Sarah Green MP
 Patrick Harvie MSP
 Andrew Heyn CMG OBE
 Mike Kane MP
 Afzal Khan CBE MP
 Rebecca Long-Bailey MP
 Sylvia Pankhurst, feminist and campaigner
 Christopher Quinlan KC
 Paul Scriven (Lord Scriven)
 Grant Shapps MP
Sport
 Michael Appleton, football manager and coach
 Karen Bardsley, professional footballer
 Mike Butt, Wales international rugby league footballer
 Kadeena Cox OBE, parasport athlete
 Mark Cueto MBE, former professional rugby player
 Ashley Giles MBE, former professional cricketer
 Danny Grewcock MBE, former England rugby player
 Steve Round, Assistant Manager, Arsenal
 Gordon Taylor OBE, former professional footballer
 Tim Williams, Chief Executive, Oxford United Football Club

See also

 Armorial of UK universities
 List of universities in the UK
 Post-1992 universities

References

External links

 

 

 
University Alliance
Educational institutions established in 1970
1970 establishments in England
Buildings and structures in Manchester
Universities UK